This article is about the demographics of Abkhazia, including population density, ethnicity, education level, health, socioeconomic status, religious affiliations and other aspects of the population.

Size
The exact present size of Abkhazia's population is disputed. According to the 2011 census it measured 240,705 people, but this is contested by Georgian authorities. The Department of Statistics of Georgia estimated Abkhazia's population to be approximately 179,000 in 2003, and 178,000 in 2005 (the last year when such estimates were published in Georgia). 

Encyclopædia Britannica estimates the population in 2007 at 180,000 and the International Crisis Group estimates Abkhazia's total population in 2006 to be between 157,000 and 190,000 (or between 180,000 and 220,000 as estimated by United Nations Development Program in 1998).

The size of Abkhazia's population more than halved due to the 1992-1993 war – at the time of the 1989 census it had measured 525,061.

Vital statistics

Ethnic composition

The population of Abkhazia remains ethnically very diverse, even after the 1992-1993 War. As of 2011 the population of Abkhazia is mainly made up of ethnic Abkhaz (50.71%), Georgians (mostly Mingrelians) (17.93%), Hamshemin Armenians (17.39%), and Russians (9.17%).

Historical developments

The demographics of Abkhazia were affected by the Caucasus War and subsequent forced expulsion and migration of Muslim Abkhaz, Russian policy of settling Georgians, Russians and others in Abkhazia and by the 1992-1993 war, which saw the ethnic cleansing of Georgians in Abkhazia. Prior to the war, ethnic Georgians made up 45.7% of Abkhazia's population of 525,061, however, by 1993, most Georgians and some Russians and Armenians had fled Abkhazia or had been ethnically cleansed. The ethnic composition of Abkhazia in past and current times plays a central role in the Georgian-Abkhazian conflict.

The earliest reliable records for Abkhazia are the Family Lists compiled in 1886, according to which the Sukhum Okrug (district of the Kutais Governorate of the Caucasus Viceroyalty of the Russian Empire) population was 68,773 of which 4,166 were Georgians (3,558 Mingrelians), 28,323 Abkhaz, 30,640 Samurzaq’anoans, 2,149 Greeks, 1,090 Armenians, 1,090 Russians, 637 Estonians.

According to the 1897 census there were 58,697 people in Abkhazia who listed Abkhaz as their mother tongue, 23,810 people listed Mingrelian as their mother tongue, 1,971 people listed Georgian (including Imeretian dialect) as their mother tongue. The population of the Sukhumi district (Abkhazia) was about 100,000 at that time. Greeks, Russians and Armenians composed 3.5%, 2% and 1.5% of the district's population. By the end of the nineteenth century, Abkhazians made up slightly more than 53% of the population of Abkhazia. According to the 1917 agricultural census organized by the Russian Provisional Government, Georgians and Abkhaz composed 41.7% (54,760) and 30,4% (39,915) of the rural population of Abkhazia respectively.

During the Soviet Union, the Russian, Armenian, Greek and Georgian population grew faster than the Abkhaz, due to the large-scale migration enforced especially under the rule of Joseph Stalin and Lavrenty Beria, who himself was a Georgian born in Abkhazia.

In 2008 almost all of the circa 2000 Svans in the upper Kodori Valley fled Abkhazia when this tract of land was conquered by the Abkhazian army during the August war. The Abkhazian authorities have appealed for the Svan refugees to return, but by late March 2009 only 130 people continued to live in the upper Kodori Valley.

In 1993, during the military conflict, the Georgian/Mingrelian inhabitants of the Gali district left Abkhazia, however after some time nearly all came back.

The Abkhazian government has been trying to attract members of the Abkhaz diaspora (mainly in Turkey). In August 2013, the State Committee for Repatriation announced that since 1993, 7365 diaspora members had returned to Abkhazia, of which 4268 from Turkey, 494 from Syria, 107 from Egypt and Jordan and 2496 from Russia and other countries.

In September 2014, the Ministry of Internal Affairs of Abkhazia announced that 273 Ukrainians fleeing the War in Donbass had come to Abkhazia.

The following tables summarise the results of the censuses carried out in Abkhazia.

The number of Abkhaz might be inflated in the last census. The growth of Abkhaz also probably reflects decisions by those of mixed ancestry to declare themselves as Abkhaz.

See also 

 Demographics of Georgia
 Armenians in Abkhazia
 History of the Jews in Abkhazia
 Afro-Abkhazians

Notes

References

Citations

Sources 

 Ethno-demographic history of Abkhazia, 1886–1989, by Daniel Müller.
 The Stalin-Beria Terror in Abkhazia, 1936-1953, by Stephen D. Shenfield
 State-Legal Relations Between Abkhazia and Georgia